Nebulosa cletor is a moth of the family Notodontidae. It is found in Ecuador and Bolivia.

References

Moths described in 1893
Notodontidae of South America